Pavel Haas (21 June 189917 October 1944) was a Czech composer who was murdered during the Holocaust. He was an exponent of Leoš Janáček's school of composition, and also utilized elements of folk music and jazz. Although his output was not large, he is notable particularly for his song cycles and string quartets.

Pre-war
Haas was born in Brno, into a Moravian-Jewish family. His father, Zikmund, a shoemaker by trade, was from the Moravian region, while his mother, Olga (née Epstein), was born in Odessa. After studying piano privately, Haas began his more formal musical education at the age of 14 and studied composition at the Brno Conservatory from 1919 to 1921 under Jan Kunc and Vilém Petrželka. This was followed by two years of study in the master class of the noted Czech composer Leoš Janáček. Janáček was far and away Haas's most influential teacher, and Haas, in turn, proved to be Janáček's best student. In 1935 he married Soňa Jakobson, the former wife of Russian linguist Roman Jakobson.

Of the more than 50 works Haas wrote during the rest of his life, only 18 were given opus numbers by the self-critical composer. While still working in his father's business, he wrote musical works of all kinds, including symphonic and choral works, lieder, chamber music, and scores for cinema and theatre. His opera, Šarlatán (The Charlatan), was first performed in Brno to sincere acclaim in April 1938. He received the Smetana Foundation award for the opera (sharing the award with Vítězslava Kaprálová who received it for her Military Sinfonietta).

The war
In 1941, Haas was deported to the Theresienstadt concentration camp (Terezín). He was one of several Moravian-Jewish composers there, including Viktor Ullmann, Gideon Klein and Hans Krása. Prior to his arrest, he had officially divorced his wife Soňa in order that she and their young daughter, Olga, would not suffer a similar fate. In 1938, in desperation, he wrote to relatives of his wife in New Jersey, and also to Frank Rybka in New York, who was a former student of Janáček. An attempt was launched by these Americans to help Haas secure passage, but this came too late to help. On his arrival at Theresienstadt, he became very depressed and had to be coaxed into composition by Gideon Klein. Haas wrote at least eight compositions in the camp, only a few of which have survived. They include a set of Four Songs on Chinese Poetry for baritone and piano, a work for men's choir titled "Al s'fod" (his first and only work in Hebrew), and the Study for String Orchestra which was premiered in Theresienstadt under the Czech conductor Karel Ančerl and is probably Haas's best-known work today. The orchestral parts were found by Ančerl after the liberation of Theresienstadt and the score was reconstructed.

In 1944 the Nazis remodeled Theresienstadt just before a visit from the Red Cross, and a propaganda film, Der Führer schenkt den Juden eine Stadt (The Führer Gives the Jews a City), was made by director Kurt Gerron, under the coercion of the camp commandant, Karl Rahm. In the film, Theresienstadt, children are seen singing Hans Krása's opera, Brundibár, and Haas can be seen taking a bow after a performance, conducted by Karel Ančerl, of his Study for Strings. When the propaganda project was over, the Nazis transferred 18,000 prisoners, including Haas and the children who had sung in Brundibár, to Auschwitz-Birkenau, where they were murdered in the gas chambers. According to the testimony of Karel Ančerl, Haas stood next to him after their arrival at Auschwitz. Doctor Mengele was about to send Ančerl to the gas chamber first, but the weakened Haas began to cough, so the death sentence was chosen for him instead. After the war Ančerl met with Haas's brother Hugo and told him the story.

Post-war
Haas's large-scale symphony, which he began prior to his deportation to Theresienstadt, remained unfinished, but the extant material was orchestrated by Zdeněk Zouhar in 1994. Haas's music, stemming from Bohemian and Moravian roots, is sometimes tinted by Hebrew melody.

Haas has been described as "a reserved but eloquent student of Janáček" by Alex Ross in his history of classical music in the 20th century, The Rest is Noise: Listening to the Twentieth Century.

His brother Hugo Haas (1901–1968) was a popular actor in pre-war Czechoslovakia.

Works
Principal publishers: Boosey & Hawkes, Bote & Bock, Sádlo, Tempo

Recordings 
 Šarlatán (complete opera) – Prague Philharmonic Choir, Prague State Opera Orchestra, Israel Yinon (conductor); Decca Record Company 460 042-2 (1998)
 Pavel Haas: Orchestral Music – Staatsphilharmonie Brünn, Israel Yinon (conductor); Koch Schwann (1996)
     Scherzo triste, Op. 5
     Charlatan (opera suite), Op. 14
     Symphonie (unfinished; orchestration )
 Janáček/Haas/Szymanowski: String Quartets Arranged for String Orchestra – Australian Chamber Orchestra, Richard Tognetti (conductor); Chandos CD 10016
     String Quartet No. 2 "Z opičích hor", Op. 7
 Pavel Haas: String Quartets 1-3 (Czech Degenerate Music, Volume 2) – Kocian Quartet; Praga Productions 250 118 (1998)
 Haas and Janáček String Quartets – Pavel Haas Quartet, Supraphon SU 3922-2
     String Quartet No. 1 in C-sharp minor, Op. 3
     String Quartet No. 3, Op. 15
 Haas/Korngold/Haydn string quartets: String quartet No. 2. Adamas Quartett; Gramola 2013.
 Pavel Haas: Bläserquintett, Suiten Op. 13 • Op. 17, Vyvolená – Jörg Dürmüller (tenor), Dennis Russell Davies (piano), Stuttgarter Bläserquintet; Orfeo International Music C 386 961 A (1996)
     Wind Quintet, Op. 10
     Suite for Piano, Op. 13
     Suite for Oboe and Piano, Op. 17
     Vyvolená, Op. 8
 Chamber Music of Pavel Haas – Ensemble Villa Musica; MD&G 304 1524-2
     Wind Quintet, Op. 10
     Suite for Oboe and Piano, Op. 17
     String Quartet No. 3, Op. 15
 Risonanza – Vilém Veverka (oboe), Ivo Kahánek (piano); Supraphon SU 3993-2
     Suite for Oboe and Piano
 Music from Theresienstadt – Wolfgang Holzmair (baritone), Russell Ryan (piano); Bridge Records 9280
     4 Songs after Words of Chinese Poetry
 4 Songs on Chinese Poetry, sung by Christian Gerhaher, appear on a CD Terezín/Theresienstadt initiated by Anne Sofie von Otter, Deutsche Grammophon, 2007.
 KZ Musik: Encyclopedia of Music Composed in Concentration Camps, Volume 4 – Petr Matsuszek (baritone), Francesco Lotoro (piano); KZ Music 231787
     Four Chinese Songs
The whole music written in Concentration Camps (including P. Haas's Study for Orchestra, 4 Chinese Songs and Al s'fod) are contained in the CD-Encyclopedia KZ MUSIK created by Francesco Lotoro (Musikstrasse Roma- Membran Hamburg), 2007
 The Bohemian Album - Dvořák, Haas, Schulhoff – Amsterdam Sinfonietta, Candida Thompson; Channel Classics 24409, 2009.
     String Quartet No. 2 "Z opičích hor", Op. 7

Haas in literature
Haas is a central character in David Herter's First Republic trilogy, comprising the novels On the Overgrown Path, The Luminous Depths and One Who Disappeared.

Haas is mentioned in Simon Mawer's The Glass Room.

Notes

Sources

 Sadie, S. (ed.) (1980) The New Grove Dictionary of Music & Musicians, [vol. # 8].
 Ross, A. (2007) The Rest is Noise: Listening to the Twentieth Century (Farrar, Straus and Giroux, New York
 Matějková, J. Hugo Haas. Život je pes Prague: Nakladatelství XYZ, 2005.

External links 
 
 
 Pavel Haas at the Czech Music Information Centre.
 Pavel Haas, a brief biographical entry on the Boosey and Hawkes site
 Comprehensive discography of Terezin Composers by Claude Torres
 Music and the Holocaust - Pavel Haas
 Further reading and listening on Terezín: The Music 1941-44
 Pavel Haas Chamber Orchestra

1899 births
1944 deaths
Musicians from Brno
People from the Margraviate of Moravia
Czech people of Ukrainian-Jewish descent
Czech classical composers
Czech male classical composers
Jewish classical composers
Czech opera composers
Male opera composers
20th-century classical composers
Theresienstadt Ghetto prisoners
People killed by gas chamber by Nazi Germany
Czechoslovak civilians killed in World War II
Czech people who died in Auschwitz concentration camp
Czech Jews who died in the Holocaust
20th-century Czech male musicians
Brno Conservatory alumni